Haddenham is a village and civil parish in Cambridgeshire, England. In the 2001 census the parish had a population of 3,228. The 2011 census reported a population of 3,344, a figure which includes the hamlet of Aldreth.

History
The Archaeology Data Service reports Iron Age features such as ditches and possible roundhouses. Historical records of a Saxon ecclesiastical manor suggest Haddeenham was a settlement in Saxon times. Nine Anglo-Saxon graves were discovered next to the Three Kings pub.

During the Second World War, Haddenham was a Starfish bombing decoy site, both K-type (day) and Q-type (night), which were used to divert German bombing away from RAF Bomber Command's nearby airfields.

Amenities
Haddenham has shops in the High Street, and two public houses (The Three Kings and The Cherry Tree), a beauty salon, GP's surgery, art gallery, a village hall known as the Arkenstall Centre, and a library that has been volunteer-run since 2003.

Holy Trinity Church dates from the 13th century and was extensively remodelled in the 19th century. Haddenham Baptist chapel dates from the late 18th century and the present building from 1905.

In September 2012, the village's new playpark was unveiled by Baroness Scott of Needham Market.

Community
For over 40 years the village has hosted a Steam Rally, which attracts more than 20,000 visitors. The rally, with over 700 exhibits, is held in early September and raises money for local charities and causes. In 2013 it celebrated its 40th anniversary.

The annual village open day was 'Blossoms & Bygones', a Haddenham local and visitor attraction held until 2013. The event also covered the neighbouring hamlet of Aldreth and included tractor rides around the village, tours of the windmill and orchards, vintage car and tractor displays and open private gardens. In 2011 it held its 40th anniversary event, with a VE Day theme and villagers in 1940s costume. Blossoms and Bygones has now been replaced by the Aldreth Vintage Fair.

References

External links
 Village web site

Villages in Cambridgeshire
Civil parishes in Cambridgeshire
East Cambridgeshire District